Ronald Dean Robinson (born March 24, 1962) is an American former professional baseball pitcher. A right-hander, he played all or part of nine seasons in Major League Baseball for the Cincinnati Reds (1984–90) and the Milwaukee Brewers (1990–92). Robinson is married to high school sweetheart Becky Robinson. They have three children, Ronnie, Ryan and Megan.

Early career 
Robinson was drafted by the Reds out of Woodlake High School in Woodlake, California, with their first-round pick (19th overall) in the 1980 amateur draft. He spent the next four years moving through the Reds' farm system before making his major league debut on August 14, 1984.

Major league career

Reds 
Although he had been almost exclusively a starting pitcher in the minor leagues, his first major league appearance came as a relief pitcher, pitching the final two innings of a game against the St. Louis Cardinals. Four days later, he made his first major league start against the Chicago Cubs, but he recorded just one out while giving up seven runs. However, only one run was earned, as the Reds infield made three errors—two by shortstop Tom Foley -- behind him.

After being sent back to the bullpen for several games, Robinson got another chance at starting on September 2 against the Pittsburgh Pirates. This time, he was much more successful, as he recorded a complete game, giving up just seven hits to gain his first major league win, 7–1. He threw seven shutout innings in his next start, but left with the game still scoreless and did not get the win as the Reds won 1–0. He started three more games, finishing the season with a record of 1–2.

Robinson started the 1985 season back in the minor leagues with the Triple-A Denver Zephyrs. He was recalled in mid-May, and worked the rest of the season as a swingman, starting 12 games and relieving in 21.

In 1986, Robinson, who was nicknamed "The True Creature" by then-Reds manager Pete Rose, worked solely in relief, appearing in 70 games, going 10–3 with a 3.24 earned run average (ERA) and 14 saves. In 1987, he returned to the swingman role.

One of Robinson's most memorable starts came on May 2, 1988, when he came within one strike of throwing a perfect game against the Montreal Expos. With a single, Montreal's Wallace Johnson broke up what would have been the first perfect game in Reds history. According to teammate Tom Browning, Robinson was pitching with pain in his elbow so severe that he could not pick up a ball from the ground without squatting down to pick it up. Browning would throw the Reds' first perfect game four months later.

Robinson missed large chunks of both 1988 and 1989 due to injuries. After starting the 1990 season 2–2 with a 4.88 ERA in six games, the Reds traded him along with Bob Sebra to the Brewers for Glenn Braggs and Billy Bates on June 9, 1990. The trade helped propel the Reds to win the 1990 World Series.

Brewers 
The season also wound up being a good one for Robinson, at least statistically. Between his stints with the Reds and the Brewers, Robinson set career highs in wins and innings pitched, while recording seven of his eight career complete games, including his only two major league shutouts. Overall, Robinson went 14–7 with a 3.26 ERA.

In 1991, Robinson started the third game of the season on April 11, pitching 4.1 innings, but in the process he suffered an elbow injury that cost him the rest of the season. He tried to come back in 1992, but pitched in just 8 games for the Brewers before being forced to retire at age 30.

Career overview 
Robinson posted a career win–loss record of 48–39 with a 3.63 ERA and 19 saves in 232 games, 102 starts and 800 innings pitched.

Notes

References 
 Tom Browning and Dann Stupp (2006). Tom Browning's Tales from the Reds Dugout. Sports Publishing LLC.

External links 

Major League Baseball pitchers
Milwaukee Brewers players
Cincinnati Reds players
Tampa Tarpons (1957–1987) players
Cedar Rapids Reds players
Waterbury Reds players
Indianapolis Indians players
Wichita Aeros players
Denver Zephyrs players
Nashville Sounds players
Chattanooga Lookouts players
Stockton Ports players
El Paso Diablos players
Baseball players from California
1962 births
Living people
People from Exeter, California
People from Woodlake, California